Coleophora kroneella is a moth of the family Coleophoridae. It is found from  Switzerland to Italy and Greece and from Austria to Romania.

The larvae feed on Amelanchier, Pyrus communis and Sorbus. They create a trivalved case of about 7 mm in length. the mouth angle is about 30°. The case is blackish, with a reddish end. Full-grown cases can be found from May to June.

References

kroneella
Moths described in 1899
Moths of Europe